Xander Blomme (born 21 June 2002) is a Belgian professional footballer who plays as a midfielder for Dutch club Go Ahead Eagles.

Club career
Blomme began his career at the youth academy of Club Brugge. On 22 August 2020, Blomme made his debut for Brugge's reserve side, Club NXT in the Belgian First Division B against RWDM47. He started as NXT lost 0–2.

On 18 February 2022, Blomme agreed to join Go Ahead Eagles in the Netherlands for the 2022–23 and 2023–24 season.

Career statistics

Club

References

External links
Profile at the Belgian Pro League website

2002 births
Living people
Belgian footballers
Association football midfielders
Club NXT players
Club Brugge KV players
Go Ahead Eagles players
Challenger Pro League players
Belgian expatriate footballers
Expatriate footballers in the Netherlands
Belgian expatriate sportspeople in the Netherlands